Oscar Peterson in Russia is a 1974 live album by Oscar Peterson, accompanied by Niels-Henning Ørsted Pedersen, recorded in the Soviet Union.

Track listing
 "I Got It Bad (and That Ain't Good)" (Duke Ellington, Paul Francis Webster) – 4:29
 "I Concentrate on You" (Cole Porter) – 4:28
 "Place St. Henri" (Oscar Peterson) – 6:06
 "Hogtown Blues" (Peterson) – 3:06
 "On Green Dolphin Street"	(Bronislaw Kaper, Ned Washington) – 5:59
 "You Stepped Out of a Dream" (Nacio Herb Brown, Gus Kahn) – 5:44
 "Wave" (Antonio Carlos Jobim) – 5:17
 "On the Trail" (Harold Adamson, Ferde Grofé) – 5:01
 "Take the "A" Train" (Billy Strayhorn) – 4:31
 "Summertime" (George Gershwin, Ira Gershwin, DuBose Heyward) – 4:51
 "Just Friends" (John Klenner, Sam M. Lewis) – 5:09
 "Do You Know What It Means to Miss New Orleans?" (Louis Alter, Eddie DeLange) – 3:25
 Medley: "I Loves You Porgy"/"Georgia on My Mind" (G. Gershwin, I. Gershwin, Heyward)/(Hoagy Carmichael, Stuart Gorrell) – 3:45
 "Lil' Darlin'" (Neal Hefti) – 6:33
 "Watch What Happens" (Jacques Demy, Norman Gimbel, Michel Legrand) – 7:59
 "Hallelujah Trail" (Peterson) – 6:35
 "Someone to Watch over Me" (G. Gershwin, I. Gershwin) – 3:41

Personnel

Performance
 Oscar Peterson – piano
 Niels-Henning Ørsted Pedersen – double bass
 Jake Hanna - drums

References

Oscar Peterson live albums
Albums produced by Norman Granz
1974 live albums
Pablo Records live albums